Collins is a census-designated place (CDP) in central Townsend Township, Huron County, Ohio, United States. As of the 2010 census the population of the CDP was 631. The CDP includes the unincorporated communities of Collins and East Townsend. Collins has a post office, with the ZIP code of 44826. Joshua Hudson is currently serving as Mayor.

History
Some say the community was named after a railroad official named Collins, while others believe the place is named after Collinsville, Connecticut.
Alternatively, some say Collins was named after Thomas Collins  of Valdosta, Georgia who settled in the area after the American Civil War.

Geography
Collins is in central Townsend Township in northeastern Huron County. Route 20 leads east  to Wakeman and west  to Norwalk, the Huron county seat.

Demographics

References

Census-designated places in Huron County, Ohio
Census-designated places in Ohio